The National Institute of Health Education & Research Patna (NIHER) is located in IDH Colony, Gulzarbagh, Patna. This institution imparts education in nursing, physiotherapy, and paramedical courses from diploma, degree to masters level. Courses available are nursing : M.SC (nursing), P.B.SC (nursing), B.SC (nursing), G.N.M, A.N.M., for physiotherpay: DPT, BPT AND MPT, for paramedical BMLT, BMRIT, BOTA, DMLT, DRIT, DECG, DOTA, DSI, CMD etc.

References

External links
 official website

Universities and colleges in Patna
1990 establishments in Bihar
Educational institutions established in 1990